Infection and Drug Resistance is a peer-reviewed medical journal covering research on infection treatments and strategies. The journal was established in 2008 and is published by Dove Medical Press. It is abstracted and indexed in PubMed, EMBASE, and Scopus.

External links 
 

English-language journals
Open access journals
Dove Medical Press academic journals
Microbiology journals
Publications established in 2008